Grandisonia sechellensis is a species of caecilian in the family Indotyphlidae. It is endemic to the Seychelles islands of Mahé, Praslin, and Silhouette.

References

 

sechellensis
Endemic fauna of Seychelles
Amphibians described in 1909
Taxonomy articles created by Polbot